Merle Schlosser (October 17, 1926) was an American football player and coach.  He played college football at the end position for the University of Illinois from 1948 to 1949.  After graduating from Illinois, Schlosser was an assistant football coach under Don Faurot at the University of Missouri.  In January 1957, he was hired as the head football coach at Western Michigan University.  He held that position for seven years from 1957 to 1963.  He compiled a record of 28–33–3 as the head coach at Western Michigan.  In 1963, his team compiled a record of 2–7 and was outscored 201 to 111.  On December 27, 1963, Western Michigan's president, James W. Miller, announced that Schlosser had been fired as football coach and would be assigned to other duties in the physical education department.  He later served as the head golf coach at Western Michigan for approximately 20 years.  In September 1985, Schlosser was hired as the head golf coach at San Diego State University and held that position until May 1986.

Head coaching record

References

1923 births
1993 deaths
American football ends
Bowling Green Falcons football coaches
Illinois Fighting Illini football players
Missouri Tigers football coaches
San Diego State Aztecs coaches
Western Michigan Broncos football coaches
College golf coaches in the United States